Franz Herre (born 11 April 1926) is a German biographer, historian and journalist.

Life
Herre grew up in Augsburg and studied history at the University of Munich, receiving his doctorate in 1949, supervised by Franz Schnabel and with a dissertation on the Augsburg middle-classes during the Age of Enlightenment. He then worked as a journalist on the Augsburger Allgemeine and Rheinischer Merkur for several years. From 1962 to 1981 he was editor-in-chief of the Deutsche Welle in Cologne. He now works as a freelance writer in Herrsching am Ammersee.

Works

Biographies
 Freiherr vom Stein: sein Leben, seine Zeit, Köln 1973.
 Kaiser Franz Joseph von Österreich: sein Leben, seine Zeit, Köln 1978.
 Kaiser Wilhelm I.: der letzte Preuße, Köln 1980.
 Radetzky: eine Biographie, Köln 1981.
 Metternich: Staatsmann des Friedens, Köln 1983.
 Moltke: der Mann und sein Jahrhundert, Stuttgart 1984.
 Ludwig II. von Bayern: sein Leben – sein Land – seine Zeit, Stuttgart 1986.
 Kaiser Friedrich III.: Deutschlands liberale Hoffnung, eine Biographie, Stuttgart 1987.
 Montgelas: Gründer des bayerischen Staates, Weilheim 1988.
 Napoleon Bonaparte: Wegbereiter des Jahrhunderts, München 1988.
 Napoleon III.: Glanz und Elend des Zweiten Kaiserreiches, München 1990.
 Bismarck: der preußische Deutsche, Köln 1991.
 Kaiser Wilhelm II.: Monarch zwischen den Zeiten, Köln 1993.
 Maria Theresia: die große Habsburgerin, Köln 1994.
 Marie Louise: Napoleon war ihr Schicksal, Köln 1996.
 Prinz Eugen: Europas heimlicher Herrscher, Stuttgart 1997.
 George Washington: Präsident an der Wiege einer Weltmacht, Stuttgart 1999.
 Eugénie: Kaiserin der Franzosen, Stuttgart 2000.
 Joséphine: Kaiserin an Napoleons Seite, Regensburg 2003.
 Napoleon Bonaparte: eine Biografie, überarbeitete Neuausgabe, Regensburg 2003.
 Marie Antoinette: vom Königsthron zum Schafott, Stuttgart u.a. 2004.
 Ludwig I.: ein Romantiker auf Bayerns Thron, Stuttgart u.a. 2005.
 Kaiserin Friedrich: Victoria, eine Engländerin in Deutschland, Stuttgart u.a. 2005.
 Friedrich Wilhelm IV.: der andere Preußenkönig, Gernsbach 2007.

Monographs 
 Das Augsburger Bürgertum im Zeitalter der Aufklärung, in Reihe: Abhandlungen zur Geschichte der Stadt Augsburg; H. 6, Diss. 1949, Augsburg u.a. 1952.
 Nation ohne Staat: Die Entstehung der deutschen Frage, Kiepenheuer & Witsch, Köln-Berlin 1967.
 Anno 70/71: Ein Krieg, ein Reich, ein Kaiser, Köln 1970; .
 Die amerikanische Revolution: Geburt einer Weltmacht, Köln 1976; .
 Deutsche und Franzosen: der lange Weg zur Freundschaft, Bergisch Gladbach 1983; .
 Die Fugger in ihrer Zeit, Wißner Verlag, Augsburg 12. Auflage 2009 .
 Die Geschichte Frankreichs. Geschrieben von Franz Herre und in Bildern erzählt von Erich Lessing, C. Bertelsmann Verlag, München 1989; .

Other  
 Bibliographie zur Zeitgeschichte und zum zweiten Weltkrieg für die Jahre 1945–1950, (edited with Hellmuth Auerbach) München 1955.
 Paris: Ein historischer Führer vom Mittelalter bis zur Belle Epoque, Köln 1972.
 Der vollkommene Feinschmecker: Einführung in die Kunst des Geniessens, Düsseldorf 1977.
 Wien: historische Spaziergänge, Köln 1992.
 A wie Adenauer: Erinnerungen an die Anfänge der Bonner Republik, Stuttgart 1997.
 Jahrhundertwende 1900: Untergangsstimmung und Fortschrittsglauben, Stuttgart 1998.
 Rom: historische Spaziergänge, Köln 1999.
 Am liebsten Pasta mit Trüffeln: ein Genießer unterwegs, München u.a. 2001.

Sources

1926 births
Living people
German biographers
German journalists
Ludwig Maximilian University of Munich alumni